The Buffalo Bandits are a lacrosse team based in Buffalo, New York playing in the National Lacrosse League (NLL). The 2006 season was the 15th in franchise history.

The Bandits captured the Eastern division title by repeating their 11-5 record from 2005. They then spoiled the Minnesota Swarm's first ever playoff game by defeating them 11-10, and advanced to the championship game by beating Rochester 15-10. The Bandits hosted the Championship game for the first time since 1997, but lost to Gary Gait's Colorado Mammoth 16-9.

Goaltender Steve Dietrich made history twice, by being the first person to be named Goaltender of the Year in consecutive years (in fact, the first person to win the award twice), and also by being the first goaltender to be named NLL Most Valuable Player.

Regular season

Conference standings

Game log
Reference:

Playoffs

Game log
Reference:

Player stats
Reference:

Runners (Top 10)

Note: GP = Games played; G = Goals; A = Assists; Pts = Points; LB = Loose Balls; PIM = Penalty minutes

Goaltenders
Note: GP = Games played; MIN = Minutes; W = Wins; L = Losses; GA = Goals against; Sv% = Save percentage; GAA = Goals against average

Awards

Transactions

Trades

Roster
Reference:

See also
2006 NLL season

References

Buffalo
Buffalo Bandits